The 2008 Women's Junior World Handball Championship was the 16th edition of the tournament and took place in Macedonia from 21 July to 3 August 2008.

Germany won the gold-medal match by defeating Denmark 25-23 while South Korea got the bronze medal.

Hosting rights and draw
Macedonia won the hosting rights to host the 2008 edition at an IHF congress in April 2007. The draw for the 2008 edition was held on May 18, 2008 at SRC Kale in Skopje with the twenty teams being drawn in four groups of five. Three weeks before the championship began, Uruguay withdrew from the competition as they was replaced by Chile.

Preliminary round

Group A

Group B

Group C

Group D

Main round

Group I

Group II

Placement round

Group I

Group II

Placement matches

19th/20th

17th/18th

15th/16th

13th/14th

11th/12th

9th/10th

7th/8th

5th/6th

Final round

Semi-finals

Third-place game

Final

Ranking and awards

Final ranking

All Star Team
Goalkeeper: 
Left wing: 
Left back: 
Pivot: 
Centre back: 
Right back: 
Right wing: 
Chosen by team officials and IHF experts

Other awards
Most Valuable Player: 
Top Goalscorer:  65 goals

References

External links 
 
 
 

International handball competitions hosted by North Macedonia
Women's Junior World Handball Championship, 2008
2008
Women's handball in North Macedonia
Junior World Handball Championship
World Junior
World Junior
Junior Handball